Kadal Meengal is a 1981 Indian Tamil-language masala film directed by G. N. Rangarajan, starring Kamal Haasan, Sujatha, Nagesh and Swapna. It is a remake of the 1980 Malayalam film Meen, and also draws inspiration from the Hindi film Trishul (1978). The film revolves around a man seeking revenge on his father for abandoning the former's mother. It was released on 5 June 1981.

Plot 

Selvanayakam alias is a poor but hard-working fisherman who is in love with Bhagyam from the same fishing hamlet. After a tiff with the locals, Selvam moves to a neighbouring village for fishing and is feared dead during a cyclone. Selvam returns alive after a while and unable to find Bhagyam, marries another woman. Bhagyam has borne his child but lives in isolation away from the life of Selvam who has grown to be a rich businessman. After several years, Bhagyam's son Rajan finds out about his father whom he despises for having deserted his mother. He vengefully joins his father's rivals and enters into a long confrontation with his father in business and in personal life as well.

Cast 
Kamal Haasan as Selvanayakam and Rajan (dual role)
Sujatha as Bhagyam
Nagesh as Peter
Swapna as Nisha
Ambika as Selvanayakam's daughter
Suman as Sekhar
K. A. Thangavelu as Mudhaliyar
Sangili Murugan as Dhanakodi
Thengai Srinivasan as Sivaanandham
Sukumari as Annaporani
Nizhalgal Ravi as Ravi
G. Srinivasan as Nachimuthu
K. Kannan as Vadivelu
V. Gopalakrishnan
A. R. Srinivasan
Pandu as Vadivelu's colleague

Soundtrack 
The music was composed by Ilaiyaraaja and lyrics were written by Kannadasan, Panchu Arunachalam and Gangai Amaran.

References

External links 

1980s masala films
1980s Tamil-language films
1981 films
Films directed by G. N. Rangarajan
Films scored by Ilaiyaraaja
Films with screenplays by Panchu Arunachalam
Tamil remakes of Malayalam films